Eidhean mac Cléireach, ancestor of the Ó hEidhin/Hynes family of County Galway, fl. 800.

Eidhean was a member of the dynasty of Uí Fiachrach Aidhne, and a descendant of Guaire Aidne mac Colmáin (d. 663), Fiachrae mac Eochaid Mugmedon (fl. 5th century) and thus distantly related to the dynasty of Uí Néill. His descendants ruled Aidhne for a time, most notably in the 1090s when Flaithbertaigh Ua Flaithbertaigh seized the kingship of Connacht and installed an Ó hEidhin as a puppet-king for a time. 

Eidhean was a kinsman of a number of other men whose descendants also took their surnames from them, such as

 Comhaltan mac Maol CúlairdÓ Comhaltan, Colton, Coulton
 Cathal mac ÓgánÓ Cathail, Cahill
 Giolla Ceallaigh mac ComhaltanMacGiolla Ceallaigh, Kilkelly
and, of course
 Cleireach himself

Though in many cases the relationship between these men was quite distant, Eidhean would have been a contemporary or near-contemporary of almost all of them. 

He was killed in battle against Neide mac Onchu, about the year 800.

See also

 Tighearnach Ua Cleirigh (died 916) was King of Uí Fiachrach Aidhne.

References
 The Surnames of Ireland, Edward MacLysaght, Dublin, 1978.
 Irish Kings and High Kings, Francis John Byrne, 2001 (second edition).
 The Great Book of Irish Genealogies, 257.9, pp. 586-87, volume one, Dubhaltach MacFhirbhisigh; edited, with translation and indices by Nollaig Ó Muraíle, 2003-2004. .

People from County Galway
7th-century Irish people
8th-century Irish people
Gaels